Leslie Atchinson Thompson (October 8, 1806 – January 23, 1874) was a lawyer, author of works on legal subjects, politician, and judge. He was city clerk, treasurer, and mayor of Tallahassee. He also served as an associate justice of the Supreme Court of Florida from 1851 to 1853.

Early life and education
Born in Charleston, South Carolina, "[t]he Thompson family moved to Savannah, Georgia, not long after Leslie was born". Thompson went to college in Savannah, and studied law in the office of a local judge to be admitted to the Georgia Bar in 1826. He moved to Tallahassee, Florida the following year.

Career and writing
Thompson opened a law practice in Tallahassee, which flourished. Thompson then "began to participate in the politics of the state capital", serving as city clerk, treasurer and mayor. In 1838, Thompson was selected to represent Leon County, Florida at the state's Constitutional Convention, held in St. Joseph, Florida from 1838 to 1839.

Thompson was "a prolific writer" who "authored several classic treatises on Florida law". Following Florida's ascension to statehood in 1845, the Florida Legislature appointed Thompson to compile a digest of the general and public laws of the state and territory, which sold 1,500 copies, and which placed Thompson "in the forefront of the legal profession", and "was a much-cited reference source for many years". Other writings by Thompson included "a compilation of the British statutes that were incorporated as part of Florida's laws", and the rules of practice for Florida's circuit courts.

Judicial service
In January, 1851 the Florida legislature created a new three-member supreme court, with a chief justice and two associate justices to be elected by the legislature. Thompson was elected to a two-year term as an associate justice, along with Walker Anderson as chief justice A. G. Semmes as the other associate justice. Anderson, Semmes, and Thompson "were important in establishing the Supreme Court of Florida as an independent judicial body".

In 1853, Thompson opted to run for a full term as chief justice, but was defeated in the popular election by Thomas Baltzell.

Later life and death
Following his electoral defeat, Thompson moved to Galveston, Texas, where he served as Mayor of Galveston and as a member of the Texas Legislature. He remained in the Legislature until his death in 1874, in Galveston.

References

Justices of the Florida Supreme Court
American lawyers admitted to the practice of law by reading law
Lawyers from Charleston, South Carolina
Florida lawyers
1806 births
1874 deaths
Mayors of Tallahassee, Florida
Mayors of Galveston, Texas
Members of the Texas Legislature
19th-century American politicians
19th-century American judges
19th-century American lawyers